This paleomammalogy list records new  fossil mammal taxa that were described during the year 2016, as well as notes other significant paleomammalogy discoveries and events which occurred during that year.

Metatherians

Metatherian research
 A near-complete skull, a snout and two maxillae assigned to the species Didelphodon vorax are described from the Late Cretaceous Hell Creek Formation (Montana and North Dakota, United States) by Wilson et al. (2016).
 Description of a new specimen of Malleodectes mirabilis and a study of phylogenetic relationships of this species is published by Archer et al. (2016).
 A study on the shape of the elbow joint of Thylacoleo carnifex and its implications for the predatory behavior of the species is published by Figueirido, Martín-Serra & Janis (2016).
 Claw marks are described from the Tight Entrance Cave (southwestern Australia) by Arman & Prideaux (2016), who interpret the marks as left by the marsupial lions.
 A study evaluating whether the climate changes were the primary driver of Pleistocene megafauna extinctions in Australia is published by Saltré et al. (2016).

New taxa

Eutherians

Research
 A study on the date of the origin of the Placentalia and an analysis of the effect of the Cretaceous–Paleogene extinction event on placental evolution is published by Halliday, Upchurch & Goswami (2016).
 A study on the influence of the methods used to establish divergence dates on the studies reconstructing body-size evolution of the Cretaceous and Paleogene eutherian mammals is published by Halliday & Goswami (2016).
 A study on the relationship between the primary productivity of plant communities and the diversity of terrestrial large mammals in North America and Europe through the Neogene is published by Fritz et al. (2016).
 Studies of the phylogenetic relationships of the glyptodonts within Xenarthra, indicating that the glyptodonts were nested within the armadillo crown group, are published by Delsuc et al. (2016) and Mitchell et al. (2016).
 A description of new fossil material of Abdounodus hamdii and a study of its phylogenetic relationships is published by Gheerbrant, Filippo & Schmitt (2016).
 A description of new fossil material of Palaeoamasia kansui and a study of phylogenetic relationships of embrithopods is published by Erdal, Antoine & Sen (2016).
 A study on the patterns of mastication in Neogene and Quaternary proboscideans as indicated by the anatomy of their teeth is published by von Koenigswald (2016).
 Part of a humerus of a large proboscidean, probably a member of the genus Deinotherium, is described from the Miocene of Finland by Salonen et al., representing the northernmost record of a Miocene proboscidean fossil in the world so far.
 Presence of lower incisors is reported in immature individuals of Cuvieronius hyodon by Mothé, Ferretti & Avilla (2018).
 A study on the diet of Platybelodon grangeri, as indicated by data from molar microwear analysis of tooth enamel, is published by Semprebon et al. (2016).
 A study on the phylogenetic relationships and mitogenomic diversity of North American mammoths, as well as its implications for mammoth population structure and dynamics during the late Pleistocene, is published by Enk et al. (2016).
 A study on the timing, causes, and consequences of the Holocene extinction of the relict woolly mammoth population from Saint Paul Island (Alaska) is published by Graham et al. (2016).
 A study on the phylogenetic relationships of the unallocated fossil species of the Old World leaf-nosed bats, particularly Miocene species from Riversleigh (Australia) is published by Wilson et al. (2016).
 A complete skull of the macraucheniid Huayqueriana cf. H. cristata is described from the Huayquerian Huayquerías Formation (Argentina) by Forasiepi et al. (2016).
 A study on the dentaries of several juvenile specimens of Prosantorhinus germanicus from the Miocene fossil lagerstätte Sandelzhausen (Germany) is published by Böhmer, Heissig & Rössner (2016), who reconstruct the tooth replacement pattern, life history and juvenile mortality profile of this taxon.
 An osteological study on the Pleistocene camelid fossils reported from Alaska and Yukon, assigned to the species Camelops hesternus, is published by Zazula et al. (2016).
 New fossil material of the Pleistocene wildebeest-like bovid Rusingoryx atopocranion is described from the Rusinga Island (Kenya) by O’Brien et al. (2016), who note the presence of large, hollow, bony nasal crests in this mammal, similar to crests present in hadrosaurid dinosaurs.
 A study on the age and phylogenetic relationships of late Pleistocene bison fossils from North America and their implications for establishing when the Pleistocene ice free corridor along the eastern slopes of the Rocky Mountains was open is published by Heintzman et al. (2016).
 Studies on the origin and evolutionary history of the European bison based on ancient DNA recovered from bison fossils are published by Soubrier et al. (2016) and Massilani et al. (2016).
 A study on the diet and evolution of ecologically-relevant traits in members of the genus Hoplitomeryx as indicated by tooth wear, hypsodonty and body mass estimations is published by DeMiguel (2016).
 Basu, Falkingham & Hutchinson (2016) present a reconstruction of the skeleton of Sivatherium giganteum and estimate adult body mass of members of the species.
 A study estimating the ability of the cetacean Ambulocetus and the desmostylians Paleoparadoxia, Neoparadoxia and Desmostylus to support themselves on land as indicated by the strengths of their rib cages against vertical compression is published by Ando & Fujiwara (2016).
 A study on the cochlear anatomy of a xenorophid specimen from the Oligocene Belgrade Formation in North Carolina (subsequently assigned to the genus Echovenator) and its implications for the evolution of high-frequency hearing and echolocation in early toothed whales is published by Park, Fitzgerald & Evans (2016).
 Description of an early Miocene dolphin from Kaikoura (New Zealand), closely related to Papahu taitapu, and a study of the phylogenetic relationships of Papahu is published by Tanaka & Fordyce (2016).
 Description of a new skull of the Pliocene porpoise Numataphocoena yamashitai recovered from the Horokaoshirarika Formation (Hokkaido, Japan) and a study on the phylogenetic relationships of the species is published by Tanaka & Ichishima (2016).
 A new aetiocetid specimen is described from the late Oligocene Pysht Formation (Washington, United States) by Marx et al. (2016), who interpret its tooth wear as inconsistent with the presence of baleen, and instead indicative of suction feeding.
 A study on the evolution of large body size in early baleen whale evolution is published by Tsai & Kohno (2016).
 A study on the anatomy of the ear region of Miocaperea pulchra and its implications for the proposed origin of the pygmy right whale from the cetotheriids is published by Marx & Fordyce (2016).
 A study on the baleen microstructures found in association with the skeleton of a late Miocene balaenopteroid whale recovered from the Pisco Formation (Peru) is published by Gioncada et al. (2016).
 A study on the anatomy and paleobiology of the Eocene pangolin Patriomanis americana is published by Gaudin, Emry & Morris (2016).
 A revision of the systematics of the North American members of Nimravidae is published by Barrett (2016).
 A study on the bone thickness of dentary bones of the specimens of Smilodon fatalis recovered from the La Brea Tar Pits and its implications for the changes in the diet of the saber-toothed cats through the time-periods that are captured at this site, is published by Binder, Cervantes & Meachen (2016).
 A study on the phylogenetic relationships of the cave lion, based on the first mitochondrial genome sequences for this taxon, is published by Barnett et al. (2016).
 A description of new bear dog fossils from the early Miocene of Uganda and Namibia and a systematic revision of the Miocene bear dogs known from Africa is published by Morales, Pickford & Valenciano (2016).
 A description of new fossil material of Megalictis ferox and a study of phylogenetic relationships of the oligobunine mustelids is published by Valenciano et al. (2016).
 A study on the feeding strategy of the arctoid Kolponomos is published by Tseng, Grohe & Flynn (2016).
 A study of phylogenetic relationships of bears belonging to the genus Arctotherium, indicating that they were more closely related to the spectacled bear than to short-faced bears, is published by Mitchell et al. (2016).
 A study on the anatomy of the auditory region of the Pleistocene bear Arctotherium tarijense is published by Arnaudo et al. (2016).
 A description of the most recent cave bear remains reported so far, recovered from the Stajnia Cave (Poland), and a study on the cave bear’s extinction time is published by Baca et al. (2016).
 A study on the diet of the cave bears, as indicated by the morphology of their mandibles, is published by van Heteren et al. (2016).
 A study on the anatomy of Enaliarctos and its implications for the evolution of tooth spacing, tooth size and pierce-feeding in pinnipeds is published by Churchill & Clementz (2016).
 A study on the enamel ultrastructure in modern eared seals and extinct Pelagiarctos is published by Loch et al. (2016).
 Fossils of an earless seal belonging to the tribe Miroungini (the tribe containing elephant seals) are described from the late Pliocene Petane Formation (New Zealand) by Boessenecker & Churchill (2016), representing the oldest record of Miroungini reported so far.
 Virtual cranial endocasts of the Eocene rodents Paramys copei and Paramys delicatus are described by Bertrand, Amador-Mughal and Silcox (2016).
 The taxonomic revision of the fossil New World porcupines known from North America is published by Sussman et al. (2016), who transfer the species Erethizon kleini Frazier (1981) and Erethizon poyeri Hulbert (1997), as well as specimens previously identified as North American porcupines from Irvingtonian faunas in Florida and Aguascalientes, Mexico, to the genus Coendou.
 Virtual cranial endocasts of the notharctines Notharctus tenebrosus and Smilodectes gracilis, as well as the adapid adapiform Adapis parisiensis are reconstructed by Harrington et al. (2016).
 Eocene (Ypresian) adapoid and omomyid limb bones are described from the Vastan lignite mine (Gujarat, India) by Dunn et al. (2016).
 Isolated teeth of a member of the genus Cebus and a member of the genus Cebuella are described from the Miocene (Mayoan) Pebas Formation (Peru) by Marivaux et al. (2016).
 Fossils of the probable relative of the gorillas, Chororapithecus abyssinicus, are dated to ~8.0 Myr by Katoh et al. (2016).
 Fossils of Homo floresiensis and the deposits containing them are dated to between about 100 000 and 60 000 years ago by Sutikna et al. (2016).
 Hominin fossils similar in most dimensions and morphological characteristics to those of Homo floresiensis are described from the early Middle Pleistocene site in Flores, Indonesia by van den Bergh et al. (2016).
 A study on the cause of death of the Australopithecus afarensis specimen Lucy is published by Kappelman et al. (2016).
 A study on the bone structural properties of the femur and humerus of the Australopithecus afarensis specimen Lucy and its implications for the locomotor behavior and ecology of the species is published by Ruff et al. (2016).
 A study on the locomotor mechanics and footprint formation of the tracemaker of the Pliocene Laetoli footprints is published by Hatala, Demes & Richmond (2016).
 Pliocene hominin tracks discovered in the new site at Laetoli locality are described by Masao et al. (2016), who estimate the height of one of the trackmakers to be about 1.65 metres, thus exceeding previous estimates for Australopithecus afarensis.
 A study on the phylogenetic relationships of Homo naledi is published by Dembo et al. (2017).
 1.5-million-year-old footprint assemblages produced by at least 20 different individuals of Homo erectus are described from multiple sites near Ileret, Kenya by Hatala et al. (2016).
 A study on the tracks of Homo erectus from Ileret, indicating repeated use of lakeshore habitats by members of this species, is published by Roach et al. (2016).
 A study on genomes of a Neanderthal and a Denisovan from the Altai Mountains in Siberia and on sequences of chromosome 21 of two Neanderthals from Spain and Croatia, and on their implications for the knowledge of gene flow events between modern and archaic humans, is published by Kuhlwilm et al. (2019).

New taxa

Xenarthrans

Afrotherians

Bats

Odd-toed ungulates

Even-toed ungulates

Cetaceans

Carnivorans

Rodents

Primates

Other eutherians

Other mammals

Research
 A study on the differences in cusp arrangement on the surface of molars of Morganucodon and Kuehneotherium and its impact on ability of the teeth to fracture prey is published by Conith et al. (2016).
 Description of a new specimen of Kollikodon ritchiei and a study of its phylogenetic relationships is published by Pian et al. (2016).
 A redescription of Teinolophos trusleri is published by Rich et al. (2016).
 A study comparing the skull anatomy of the extant platypus and the Miocene Obdurodon dicksoni is published by Asahara et al. (2016).
 A partial mandible of the amphitheriid Palaeoxonodon ooliticus, previously known only from isolated teeth, is described from the Middle Jurassic (late Bathonian) Kilmaluag Formation (Isle of Skye, Scotland, United Kingdom) by Close et al. (2016).
 A study on the morphological disparity, dietary trends and generic level taxonomic diversity patterns in early therians is published by Grossnickle & Newham (2016).

New taxa

References

2016 in paleontology
2016 in science
Prehistoric mammals